The Arzelà–Ascoli theorem is a fundamental result of mathematical analysis giving necessary and sufficient conditions to decide whether every sequence of a given family of real-valued continuous functions defined on a closed and bounded interval has a uniformly convergent subsequence.  The main condition is the equicontinuity of the family of functions. The theorem is the basis of many proofs in mathematics, including that of the Peano existence theorem in the theory of ordinary differential equations, Montel's theorem in complex analysis, and the Peter–Weyl theorem in harmonic analysis and various results concerning compactness of integral operators.

The notion of equicontinuity was introduced in the late 19th century by the Italian mathematicians Cesare Arzelà and Giulio Ascoli. Modern formulations of the theorem allow for the domain to be compact Hausdorff and for the range to be an arbitrary metric space. More general formulations of the theorem exist that give necessary and sufficient conditions for a family of functions from a compactly generated Hausdorff space into a uniform space to be compact in the compact-open topology; see .

Statement and first consequences
By definition, a sequence  of continuous functions on an interval  is uniformly bounded if there is a number  such that

for every function  belonging to the sequence, and every .

The sequence is said to be uniformly equicontinuous if, for every , there exists a  such that

whenever  for all functions  in the sequence.

One version of the theorem can be stated as follows:

Consider a sequence of real-valued continuous functions  defined on a closed and bounded interval  of the real line. If this sequence is uniformly bounded and uniformly equicontinuous, then there exists a subsequence  that converges uniformly. 
The converse is also true, in the sense that if every subsequence of itself has a uniformly convergent subsequence, then is uniformly bounded and equicontinuous.

Immediate examples

Differentiable functions
The hypotheses of the theorem are satisfied by a uniformly bounded sequence of differentiable functions with uniformly bounded derivatives.

So, given , let  to verify the definition of equicontinuity of the sequence. This proves the following corollary:

 Let {fn} be a uniformly bounded sequence of real-valued differentiable functions on  such that the derivatives {fn′} are uniformly bounded.

If, in addition, the sequence of second derivatives is also uniformly bounded, then the derivatives also converge uniformly (up to a subsequence), and so on. Another generalization holds for continuously differentiable functions.  Suppose that the functions  are continuously differentiable with derivatives . Suppose that fn′ are uniformly equicontinuous and uniformly bounded, and that the sequence  is pointwise bounded (or just bounded at a single point).  Then there is a subsequence of the converging uniformly to a continuously differentiable function.

The diagonalization argument can also be used to show that a family of infinitely differentiable functions, whose derivatives of each order are uniformly bounded, has a uniformly convergent subsequence, all of whose derivatives are also uniformly convergent. This is particularly important in the theory of distributions.

Lipschitz and Hölder continuous functions
The argument given above proves slightly more, specifically

 If is a uniformly bounded sequence of real valued functions on  such that each f is Lipschitz continuous with the same Lipschitz constant :

The limit function is also Lipschitz continuous with the same value  for the Lipschitz constant. A slight refinement is

Generalizations

Euclidean spaces
The Arzelà–Ascoli theorem holds, more generally, if the functions  take values in -dimensional Euclidean space , and the proof is very simple: just apply the -valued version of the Arzelà–Ascoli theorem  times to extract a subsequence that converges uniformly in the first coordinate, then a sub-subsequence that converges uniformly in the first two coordinates, and so on.  The above examples generalize easily to the case of functions with values in Euclidean space.

Compact metric spaces and compact Hausdorff spaces 
The definitions of boundedness and equicontinuity can be generalized to the setting of arbitrary compact metric spaces and, more generally still, compact Hausdorff spaces.  Let X be a compact Hausdorff space, and let C(X) be the space of real-valued continuous functions on X. A subset  is said to be equicontinuous if for every x ∈ X and every , x has a neighborhood Ux such that

A set  is said to be pointwise bounded if for every x ∈ X,

A version of the Theorem holds also in the space C(X) of real-valued continuous functions on a compact Hausdorff space X :

Let X be a compact Hausdorff space. Then a subset F of C(X) is relatively compact in the topology induced by the uniform norm if and only if it is equicontinuous and pointwise bounded.

The Arzelà–Ascoli theorem is thus a fundamental result in the study of the algebra of continuous functions on a compact Hausdorff space.

Various generalizations of the above quoted result are possible.  For instance, the functions can assume values in a metric space or (Hausdorff) topological vector space with only minimal changes to the statement (see, for instance):

Let X be a compact Hausdorff space and Y a metric space. Then  is compact in the compact-open topology if and only if it is equicontinuous, pointwise relatively compact and closed.

Here pointwise relatively compact means that for each x ∈ X, the set is relatively compact in Y.

In the case that Y is complete, the proof given above can be generalized in a way that does not rely on the separability of the domain.  On a compact Hausdorff space X, for instance, the equicontinuity is used to extract, for each ε = 1/n, a finite open covering of X such that the oscillation of any function in the family is less than ε on each open set in the cover.  The role of the rationals can then be played by a set of points drawn from each open set in each of the countably many covers obtained in this way, and the main part of the proof proceeds exactly as above. A similar argument is used as a part of the proof for the general version which does not assume completeness of Y.

Functions on non-compact spaces
The Arzela-Ascoli theorem generalises to functions  where  is not compact. Particularly important are cases where  is a topological vector space. Recall that if 
Let  be the subspace of
 consisting of continuous functions, equipped with the topology of compact convergence.
Then one form of the Arzèla-Ascoli theorem is the following:

This theorem immediately gives the more specialised statements above in cases where  is compact
There are a few other variants in terms of
the topology of precompact convergence or other related topologies on 
. For details one can consult Bourbaki (1998), Chapter X, § 2, nr 5.

Non-continuous functions
Solutions of numerical schemes for parabolic equations are usually piecewise constant, and therefore not continuous, in time.

Then we have the following:

Let  be a compact metric space and  a complete metric space. Let  be a sequence in  such that there exists a function  and a sequence  satisfying

Necessity
Whereas most formulations of the Arzelà–Ascoli theorem assert sufficient conditions for a family of functions to be (relatively) compact in some topology, these conditions are typically also necessary.  For instance, if a set F is compact in C(X), the Banach space of real-valued continuous functions on a compact Hausdorff space with respect to its uniform norm, then it is bounded in the uniform norm on C(X) and in particular is pointwise bounded. Let N(ε, U) be the set of all functions in F whose oscillation over an open subset U ⊂ X is less than ε:

For a fixed x∈X and ε, the sets N(ε, U) form an open covering of F as U varies over all open neighborhoods of x.  Choosing a finite subcover then gives equicontinuity.

Further examples

Let  be the set of functions  corresponding to functions  in the unit ball of the space .

This can be checked by the Arzelà–Ascoli theorem.

Therefore, a sequence converging uniformly on  can be extracted. This is a first step in the direction of  Montel's theorem.
 Let  be endowed with the uniform metric  Assume that  is a sequence of solutions of a certain partial differential equation (PDE), where the PDE ensures the following a priori estimates:  is equicontinuous for all ,  is equitight for all , and, for all  and all ,  is small enough when  is small enough. Hence, we can, by (a generalization of) the Arzelà–Ascoli theorem, conclude that  is relatively compact in

See also

Helly's selection theorem
Fréchet–Kolmogorov theorem

References

 .
 .
 .
 .
 
 .
 .
 .
 Arzelà-Ascoli theorem at Encyclopaedia of Mathematics
 
 
 

Articles containing proofs
Compactness theorems
Theory of continuous functions
Theorems in real analysis
Theorems in functional analysis
Topology of function spaces